Nguyễn Quang Thùy (died 1802) was a Vietnamese prince alive during the Tây Sơn dynasty.

Background 
A son of Nguyễn Huệ, Thùy was also a half-brother of Nguyễn Quang Toản. After Toản ascended the throne in 1792, Thùy was granted the royal title Khanh công ("Duke of Khanh"), and tasked with mobilising troops and managing civil and military affairs in Tonkin. In 1795, the regent Bùi Đắc Tuyên was overthrown by Vũ Văn Dũng, Phạm Công Hưng and Nguyễn Văn Huấn. Thùy arrested Ngô Văn Sở, a political ally of Tuyên, and transferred him to Phú Xuân.

In May 1801, the capital Phú Xuân was captured by army of Nguyễn lords. The young emperor Nguyễn Quang Toản fled to Thăng Long, and lived in Thùy's house. In August, a troop under Thùy marched south, stayed in Nghệ An. In November, the young emperor led 30 thousand men marched south. In January 1802, Thùy attacked Lũy Thầy (a strategic wall built by Đào Duy Từ, in present day Quảng Bình Province), but was defeated by Nguyễn Ánh, and retreated to Nghệ An. In the same time, Toản was utterly beaten in Linh River (modern Gianh River). They met in Nghệ An, and fled back to Thăng Long together.

Death 
In June 1802, Nguyễn army captured Thăng Long. Nguyễn Quang Thùy fled to Xương Giang (in mordern Bắc Giang), and was captured by local villagers. In order to avoid being captured, he committed suicide by hanging.

References

1802 deaths
Tây Sơn dynasty generals
18th-century Vietnamese people
19th-century Vietnamese people
Suicides by hanging in Vietnam
Year of birth unknown
Posthumous executions